CAP code may refer to:
 Coded Anti-Piracy, an anti-copyright infringement technology for motion pictures
 CAP Code, a set of rules by the Committee of Advertising Practice